Mosqueiro is an island near the south bank of the Pará River in the Brazilian state of Pará. The island has  of beaches with freshwater tides, which draw vacationers primarily in the dry season. The largest settlement on the island is the town of Vila (often referred to simply as Mosqueiro) on the westernmost part of the island.

Origin of the name
Scholars have attributed the name Mosqueiro to a corruption of the native Tupinambá word moqueio, which referred to the local practice of smoking meat and fish. In the early period of Portuguese colonization, the Tupinambá supplied smoked meat and fish to the city of Belém. The Portuguese, unfamiliar with the term moqueio, called the island Mosqueiro, which was the name of several places on the Iberian Peninsula. In Portuguese, the word mosqueiro means "flypaper".

Climate 
The rainy season peaks in March, while the dry season peaks in November.

Landmarks

Chapéu Virado
The Chapéu Virado is located on the plaza bearing its name, at the intersection of avenues 16 de Novembro and Beira Mar. It was originally a modest inn and restaurant of wood construction, dating from the heyday of the rubber plantation industry in the late nineteenth to early twentieth centuries. The hotel was constructed in a mix of European architectural styles, with allowances for the local climate. After the original structure was destroyed by fire, the mayor of Belém and the governor of Pará provided funding for its reconstruction.

(Chapel of the Sacred Heart of Jesus)
The , located on the plaza Chapéu Virado, was constructed by Guilherme Augusto de Miranda Filho in fulfillment of a promise he made to God while ill on the island, in exchange for the return of his health. The chapel was dedicated on December 17, 1909, by the acting archbishop of Belém. On the second Sunday in December, the chapel holds a special observation for the patron saint of the people of Mosqueiro.

Villa Porto Franco
Located on the plaza Chapéu Virado, the neoclassical Villa Porto Franco was once home to Portuguese artist José Franco.

Sebastião Rabelo de Oliveira Bridge
The bridge was inaugurated on January 12, 1976, with Brazilian president Ernesto Geisel in attendance.

(Mosqueiro Island Municipal Park)
Since 1988,  of the island have been set aside as a municipal park by the city of Belém, which is seeking to promote ecotourism. The park includes  of trails. The Brazilian Ministry of the Environment has approved an investment of R$200,000 (approximately US$90,000 ) in physical infrastructure, including a pier, administrative building, and research center.

Wildlife
In June 2011, an amphibian identified as belonging to the species Atretochoana eiselti was photographed near Praia de Marahú, on the island of Mosqueiro. A. eiselti, previously known only from two preserved specimens dating from the late 1800s, is the largest known lungless tetrapod.

Gallery

References

External links

Islands of the Amazon
Landforms of Pará
River islands of Brazil
Belém